The Party for Accountability, Competency and Transparency (abbreviated as PACT), formerly the Online Party of Canada (abbreviated as OPC), was a Canadian website and federally registered political party founded in October 2010. The party was founded by Michael Nicula of Toronto. The party was deregistered by Elections Canada on July 31, 2016.

Founding and governing principles
The Party for Accountability, Competency and Transparency was a non-partisan political party founded on the principles of participatory e-democracy where members voted directly on specific issues via the party website and, in return, party officials (candidates) must support the majority position on every issue, regardless of their personal position.

To ensure accountability, all PACT representatives wrote up their own Promissory Letter of Resignation before being eligible to run for office. Any PACT representative who votes against the will of the majority could be asked to resign.

Political platform

The Party for Accountability, Competency and Transparency did not have a set agenda. The political platform was a compilation of issue positions from the OPC website, voted from members and grouped by issue category, e.g., economic, healthcare, environment, etc. The key aspect of the platform is the importance given to certain categories; however, particular issues and respective positions are determined solely based on members’ votes.

Membership
Unlike most recognized political parties, all eligible voters in Canada, including members of other federal political parties, are allowed and strongly encouraged to become members of PACT in order to cast votes and comment on issues. In this sense, PACT is more like to a virtual House of Commons of Canada, representing all political stripes, rather than a traditional political party.

To ensure that each voting citizen only casts a single vote on each issue, only members' votes count toward the official party position and members are only authenticated once a signed paper form, recognized by Elections Canada, is submitted to the PACT. Through this process, every PACT member and their respective electoral district as voting citizens is verifiable through the National Register of Electors, similar to the voter identification process followed by Elections Canada during Federal Elections.

Election results

See also

 Direct democracy
 e-Democracy
 Pirate Party of Canada

References

External links

Party for Accountability, Competency and Transparency - Canadian Political Parties and Political Interest Groups - Web Archive created by the University of Toronto Libraries
Online Party of Canada – Canadian Political Parties and Political Interest Groups – Web Archive created by the University of Toronto Libraries

Direct democracy parties
Federal political parties in Canada
Political parties established in 2012
2012 establishments in Canada
Political parties disestablished in 2016
2016 disestablishments in Canada
Organizations based in Toronto